Limnaecia hemimitra is a moth of the family Cosmopterigidae. It is known from Australia.

References

Limnaecia
Moths described in 1923
Taxa named by Alfred Jefferis Turner
Moths of Australia